Hotchin is a surname. Notable people with the surname include:

Claude Hotchin (1898–1977), Australian businessman and art dealer, patron and benefactor
Mark Hotchin (born 1958), New Zealand property developer and financier
Mortimer Hotchin (1889–1958), Australian cricketer